These are the official results of the Men's Mountainbike Race at the 2000 Summer Olympics in Sydney, Australia. There were a total number of 49 participants, with twelve non-finishers, in this event over 49.5 kilometres, held on 24 September 2000 at the Fairfield City Farm.

Medalists

Final classification

See also
 Women's Cross Country Race

References

External links
 Official Report
 Report on cyclingnews.com

Cycling at the 2000 Summer Olympics
Cycling at the Summer Olympics – Men's cross-country
2000 in mountain biking
Men's events at the 2000 Summer Olympics